Ghulam Sideer (born 1943) is a former Afghanistan wrestler, who competed at the 1972 Summer Olympic Games in the bantamweight event.

References

Wrestlers at the 1972 Summer Olympics
Afghan male sport wrestlers
Olympic wrestlers of Afghanistan
1943 births
Living people
Date of birth missing (living people)